Lady Ice is a 1973 American crime film directed by Tom Gries, and stars Donald Sutherland, Jennifer O'Neill, and Robert Duvall.  The story concerns an insurance investigator who becomes involved with a wealthy young woman he suspects of fencing stolen jewelry.

Plot

In a Miami hotel room, insurance agent Andy Hammon (Sutherland) surprises Tony Lacava, a jewelry fence, at gunpoint and retrieves a diamond necklace that Lacava had concealed under his clothes.

While working at a garage Hammon encounters Paula Booth (O'Neill), a wealthy young woman who leaves her car to be repaired. He makes a lewd comment toward Paula and is summoned to see the garage owner, Booth's father, who fires him. Hammon steals Paula's car and she pursues him until she loses him at a draw bridge. Later, at her home, Paula encounters Hammon again, who presents himself as criminal and proposes a partnership. Hammon later shows her the necklace that he took from Lacava. Paula reports the encounter to her father.

Department of Justice official Ford Pierce (Duvall) shows Hammon the body of Lacava, who has been killed, and reveals that Paula, her father Paul and their partner Eddie are all under investigation as Booth senior has a large amount of unexplained wealth. Eddie tells Paula he thinks Hammon is a threat to a future deal worth $3 million and suggests killing him, but Paula protests. Hammon is attacked in his home by the thugs who killed Lacava, but they leave when Paula arrives. Hammon reveals to Paula that he is an insurance investigator from Chicago and he knows that a further shipment of jewelry is arriving soon.

In Chicago, a jewelry store is robbed. Pierce and his agents separately follow Eddie and Paula but lose both of them. Hammon, however, successfully follows Paula to a meeting with Eddie and the Chicago robbers, where they buy the stolen jewelry, and eventually to Nassau. Hammon meets with Paula and her contact, Brinker, and offers them $500,000 for the jewels. Hammon deduces that the stolen gems are being recut and sold as new jewelry items. Brinker collects the jewelry, but he is robbed by a gang hired by Hammon and claims the insurance money for the jewels.

Hammon's employers meet him in the Bahamas and tell him to obtain a signed statement from Paula, stating that the recut jewels are the same as the stolen ones. Hammon meets Paula to negotiate the deal and offers her $600,000 and immunity from prosecution. Paula accepts, and they depart to retrieve the jewels but Eddie arrives and takes them for himself. The police pursue Eddie as Hammon and Paula look on.

Cast
 Donald Sutherland as Andy Hammon
 Jennifer O'Neill as Paula Booth
 Robert Duvall as Ford Pierce
 Patrick Magee as Paul Booth
 Jon Cypher as Eddie Stell
 Eric Braeden as Peter Brinker
 Perry Lopez as Carlos

Production
George Lucas was offered the chance to direct, but he turned it down in favor of focusing on finding a studio for American Graffiti.

Reception
Leonard Maltin awarded the film two stars.

See also
 List of American films of 1973

References

External links
 
 

1973 films
1970s crime thriller films
American crime thriller films
American heist films
American detective films
Films set in Miami
Films shot in Miami
Films directed by Tom Gries
Films scored by Perry Botkin Jr.
1970s English-language films
1970s American films